is an Apophis-sized asteroid that was discovered on 11 October 2021 when it was  from Earth. As the observation arc became longer the nominal distance from Earth became further on the potential impact date.

See also

References

External links 
 
 
 

Minor planet object articles (unnumbered)
Discoveries by MLS
Near-Earth objects removed from the Sentry Risk Table
20211011
20211030